Jack Compton (14 February 1918 – 26 July 1983) was a former Australian rules footballer who played with Melbourne in the Victorian Football League (VFL).

Notes

External links 

1918 births
Australian rules footballers from Western Australia
Melbourne Football Club players
Claremont Football Club players
1983 deaths